Janggunite is a rare manganese oxide mineral with the chemical formula .

It was first described in 1975 for an occurrence in the Janggun mine, Bonghwa-gun, Gyeongsangbuk-do, South Korea and named for the locality.

References

Oxide minerals
Manganese minerals
Orthorhombic minerals
Minerals in space group 53